Casanova Wong, also known as Ka Sat-fat (卡薩伐), is a Korean Hong Kong film actor and martial artist born in 1945 as Kim Yong-ho in Gimje, South Korea. An expert in tae kwon do, he is a leg-fighter, and is well known for his spin kicks and was nicknamed "The Human Tornado" in the Republic of Korea Army.  He made many appearances in martial arts movies  but is most remembered for his role as Cashier Hua in Warriors Two, where he starred alongside Sammo Hung, with whom he worked several times. Other films included Story of Drunken Master and Rivals of the Silver Fox. One of Wong's last notable movie appearances was as Kang-ho in the 1994 Korean movie Bloody Mafia.

He is now a movie producer in Asia.

Filmography

Films 
This is a partial list of films.
Gate of Destiny (1974)
Secret Envoy (1976)
The Martialmates (1976)
The Shaolin Plot (1977) – Monk
The Iron Fisted Monk (1977) – Shaolin disciple 
Four Masters (1977)
Golden Gate (1977)
Righteous Fighter (1977)
Enter the Invincible Hero (1977) – Master Pang
Lone Shaolin Avenger (1978)
The Legendary Strike (1978) – one of Yun`s man
Warriors Two (1978) – Cashier Wah
Game of Death (1978) – Lau Yea Chun
The Shaolin Fighter (1978) – See Pak
Strike of Thunderkick Tiger (1978) – Monkey
The Magnificent (1979) – Thunder Leg
Duel of the 7 Tigers (1979)
The Story of Drunken Master (1979) – Chi Wai
Rivals of the Silver Fox (1979)
Wonderman From Shaolin (1979)
Avenging Boxer (1979) – Wo Pa Fong
The Monk`s Fight (1979) – the Big Boss
My Kung Fu 12 Kicks (1979)
The Master Strikes (1980) – Tseng Tien-tu
Kung Fu Kids Break Away (1980) – Eagle
Fire Lord (1980)
The Wonderful Hong Kong (1980)
Master Killers (1980)
Game of Death 2 (1981) – Billy Lo`s Korean challenger (Archive footage from GAME OF DEATH)
Enter the Invincible Hero (1981) – Pang (Also footage from THE MAGNIFICENT)
In the Claws of CIA (1981) – Johnny Wong
Seven Finger Kung Fu (1981)
Blow Up (1982) - Hung
Bruce Lee Strikes Back (1982) – Cheng`s Brother
Jin hu men (1982)
Warriors of Kung Fu (1982) – Yu Yung
My Name is Twin Legs (1982)
Sha shou ying (1982) – Johnny Wong
Duel to the Death (1983, fights the flying ninjas)
South Shaolin VS North Shaolin (1984)
Rocky`s Love Affairs (1985)
Golden Destroyer (1985)
Sword of Evil Power (1985)
Kickboxer the Champion (1990)
Telepathy Adventure (1991)
Blues of Chongro (1994)
Blood Mafia (1994)
Faster (2003)

References

External links 
 

South Korean male film actors
1945 births
Living people
People from Gimje
South Korean film producers
South Korean male taekwondo practitioners